The 2007 Internationaux de Strasbourg was a women's tennis tournament played on outdoor clay courts. It was the 21st edition of the Internationaux de Strasbourg, and was part of the Tier III Series of the 2007 WTA Tour. The tournament took place at the Centre Sportif de Hautepierre in Strasbourg, France, from 21 May until 26 May 2007. Sixth-seeded Anabel Medina Garrigues won the singles title and earned $25,865 first-prize money.

Finals

Singles

 Anabel Medina Garrigues defeated  Amélie Mauresmo, 6–4, 4–6, 6–4

Doubles

 Yan Zi /  Zheng Jie defeated  Alicia Molik /  Sun Tiantian, 6–3, 6–4

External links
 Official website
 ITF tournament edition details
 Tournament draws

Internationaux de Strasbourg
2007
Internationaux de Strasbourg
Internationaux de Strasbourg
Internationaux de Strasbourg